Peppino di Capri (born Giuseppe Faiella on 27 July 1939) is an Italian popular music singer, songwriter and pianist, successful in Italy and Europe. His international hits include "St. Tropez Twist", "Daniela", "Torna piccina", "Roberta", "Melancolie", "Freva", "L'ultimo romantico", "Un grande amore e niente più", "Non lo faccio più", "Nun è peccato", and "Champagne".

Biography

Peppino began singing and playing the piano at age 4, entertaining the American army troops stationed on the island of Capri with a repertoire of American standards. After 6 years of classical studies and playing at nightclubs around Capri, Peppino and his group The Rockers released their first single, with the songs "Malattia" ("Sickness") and "Nun è Peccato" ("It's not a sin"), sung in Neapolitan in 1958.

The single was an instant hit, and Peppino spent most of the following year touring. A string of hit singles soon followed, usually alternating between Italian versions of American rock'n'roll and twist songs (with some verses sung in English), and originals in Italian and Napoletano, and di Capri became one of the top acts in the country.

After performing as the opening act for The Beatles in their 1965 tour of Italy, Peppino and his group attempted, with moderate success, to break out of the European market. Their work was well received, particularly in Brazil, thanks to the large Italian immigrant community in the country.

The 1970s saw Peppino with a new band, the New Rockers. He won the prestigious Festival della canzone italiana ("Festival of Italian song", better known as the San Remo Festival) in 1973, with the song "Un grande amore e niente più" ("A great love and nothing more").

The same year, he released the song "Champagne" that was a big hit in Italy, Germany, Spain and Brazil.

He won the Festival della canzone italiana again in 1976, with the song "Non lo faccio più" ("I won't do it anymore"). He represented Italy in the Eurovision Song Contest 1991, coming in 7th place with 89 points with the song "Comme è ddoce 'o mare" ("How sweet is the sea"), sung in Neapolitan.

As of 2006, Peppino di Capri is the performer with the most appearances (15) at the Festival della canzone italiana, his last appearance being in 2005, singing "La Panchina" ("The little park bench").

San Remo Festival

Peppino di Capri has participated 15 times in the San Remo Festival, twice winning first place:

 1967 "Dedicato all'amore"
 1971 "L'ultimo romantico"
 1973 "Un grande amore e niente più"  (winner)
 1976 "Non lo faccio più"  (winner)
 1980 "Tu cioè..."
 1985 "E mo’ e mo’"
 1987 "Il sognatore"
 1988 "Nun chiagnere"
 1989 "Il mio pianoforte"
 1990 "Evviva Maria"
 1992 "Favola blues"
 1993 "La voce delle stelle"
 1995 "Ma che ne sai (Se non hai fatto il pianobar)"
 2001 "Pioverà (Habibi ené)"
 2005 "La panchina"

Literary references
In his writings, Orhan Pamuk brings up Peppino di Capri's songs.
His novel Snow, taking place at the Turkish provincial town of Kars, includes the following passage:

"Through the open door of a shop which sold women's stockings, bolts of cotton, coloured pencils, batteries and cassettes, he heard once again the strains of Peppino di Capri's "Roberta". He recalled hearing it on the radio when he was a child and his uncle had taken him out for a drive to the Bosphorus" (Snow, Ch. 12).

In The Museum of Innocence, he writes:
"Later on I wrapped my arms around the ever patient and compassionate Sibel, swaying with her as Pepino di Capri sang “Melancholy.”" (The Museum of Innocence, Ch. 29)

Bibliography
 Cinquant'anni 1958–2008 by Vincenzo Faiella and Sergio Vellino. A collection of his worldwide discography, filmography, etc. Nicola Longobardi Editore 2008. "All the covers of the records, pictures, filmography, sheet music, film posters and all the other information were taken from the private collection of Francesco and Antonio Mastroianni". (In Italian)

External links

  

1939 births
Living people
People from Capri, Campania
Italian male singers
Italian bandleaders
Eurovision Song Contest entrants for Italy
Eurovision Song Contest entrants of 1991
Sanremo Music Festival winners